Theodor Danetti (August 23, 1926 – January 16, 2016) was a Romanian stage and film actor.

Life 
Danetti was born in 1926 in Corabia. He graduated from Caragiale Academy of Theatrical Arts and Cinematography in 1955. He was distributed to the Baia Mare State Theatre, then he performed at the Piatra-Neamț Youth Theatre (1965–1975), State Jewish Theatre and Bulandra Theatre.

Partial filmography

 Bălcescu (1953)
 Vin cicliștii (1968)  
 Singur printre prieteni (1979)
 Concurs (1982) - Aristide
 Moara lui Călifar (1984)
 Ciuleandra (1985)
 Cuibul de viespi (1987) - Antreprenor pompe funebre
 Figuranții (1987)
 Momentul adevărului (1989)
 Dreptatea (1989)
 Vinovatul (1991)
 Divorț... din dragoste (1991)
 È pericoloso sporgersi (1993)
 Bloodlust: Subspecies III (1994) - Innkeeper
 Crucea de piatră – ultimul bordel (1994) - Radu's father
 În fiecare zi e noapte (1995, Short) - Vecinul
 The Midas Touch (1997) - Old Man
 Little Ghost (1997) - Worker - Federov
 Johnny Mysto: Boy Wizard (1997) - Village Elder
 Train of Life (1998) - Sage 2
 The Excalibur Kid (1999) - Old Man at Court
 Teenage Space Vampires (1999) - Clerk
 Diplomatic Siege (1999) - Curator
 Shapeshifter (1999) - Janos
 Fii cu ochii pe fericire (1999)
 Elvira's Haunted Hills (2001) - The Innkeeper
 Amen. (2002) - Old Cardinal
 Maria (2003)
 Boudica (2003, TV Movie) - Master of Ceremonies
 Modigliani (2004) - Renoir
 Icon (2005, TV Movie) - Leonid Zaitsev
 The Wind in the Willows (2006, TV Movie) - Otter (uncredited)
 Youth Without Youth (2007) - dr. Neculache
 Inima de tigan (2007) - Miguel Pajarito
 Mar Nero (2008) - Nicolae - Angela's father
 The Dot Man (2008)
 Adam Resurrected (2008) - Blum
 Schimb valutar (2008)
 Hellhounds (2009, TV Movie) - Charon
 Bunraku (2010) - General
 The Dot Man (2017) - The Old Man (final film role)

References

External links 

Caragiale National University of Theatre and Film alumni
Romanian male film actors
Romanian male stage actors
2016 deaths
Romanian Sephardi Jews
1926 births
People from Corabia